The women's team pursuit race of the 2015–16 ISU Speed Skating World Cup 3, arranged in Eisstadion Inzell, in Inzell, Germany, was held on 5 December 2015.

The Japanese team won the race, while the Dutch team came second, and the Russian team came third.

Results
The race took place on Saturday, 5 December, in the afternoon session, scheduled at 16:47.

References

Women team pursuit
3